Aleksey Teslyuk (born 10 October 1994) is a Belarusian professional footballer who plays for Lokomotiv Gomel.

References

External links
 
 
 Profile at Gomel website

1994 births
Living people
Belarusian footballers
Association football forwards
FC Gomel players
FC Smolevichi players
FC Rukh Brest players
FC Volna Pinsk players
FC Lokomotiv Gomel players